A Nymphoid Barbarian in Dinosaur Hell is a 1990 low-budget science fiction film from Troma Entertainment and directed by Brett Piper. It premiered at the 1990 Cannes Film Festival. Piper also worked on the special effects.

Plot
The last woman on Earth has to deal with lizard men, a giant, monsters, and a love interest.

Production
DVD Talk reviewer Adam Tyner said that the film has no nymphoid barbarian, no dinosaurs, and no dinosaur hell. It was originally titled Dark Fortress. The film either cost US$40,000 or US$5,000. Director Brett Piper, who was also responsible for the special effects, used puppets that were about ten inches (25 cm) long. One of the puppets created by Piper is a bat creature that is based on the 1962 film Jack the Giant Killer.  Piper said that all of the scenes with animation were completed within a few days. The jaws of the Tromasaurus consisted of mostly Styrofoam and the teenaged daughter of co-producer Al Pirnie operated them in a few parts.

Release
Co-founder of Troma Entertainment Lloyd Kaufman said about its premiere at the 1990 Cannes Film Festival that "no one else was dumb enough to do a dinosaur movie". The film was released on the USA Network in the early 1990s. The DVD release has film trailers, an interview with Kaufman, two Troma PSAs, Troma film clips, a dance titled Radiation March, and advertisements for Troma-related material. DVD Talk reviewer Tyner said of the DVD, "The video is full-frame, grainy, and poorly authored, with nasty artifacts throughout. The print used is awful, even warranting a complaint in the commentary, and it looks about the same as the version I saw on the USA Network around '92." It was the most viewed film on Hulu on the March 2, 2010 weekend which Kaufman attributed to its title.

Reception
Tyner of DVD Talk said, "Although A Nymphoid Barbarian In Dinosaur Hell isn't really a Troma movie in the usual sense and the movie itself is so boring that it borders on unwatchable, the commentary really is worth paying full retail for." Author Mark F. Berry said that the film has "no quest, no goal, no story arc whatsoever".

References

1990 independent films
1990 science fiction films
Troma Entertainment films
1990s English-language films